Hercules is the Roman equivalent of the Greek divine hero Heracles, son of Jupiter and the mortal Alcmena. In classical mythology, Hercules is famous for his strength and for his numerous far-ranging adventures.

The Romans adapted the Greek hero's iconography and myths for their literature and art under the name Hercules. In later Western art and literature and in popular culture, Hercules is more commonly used than Heracles as the name of the hero. Hercules is a multifaceted figure with contradictory characteristics, which enabled later artists and writers to pick and choose how to represent him. This article provides an introduction to representations of Hercules in the later tradition.

Mythology

Birth and early life
In Roman mythology, although Hercules was seen as the champion of the weak and a great protector, his personal problems started at birth. Juno sent two witches to prevent the birth, but they were tricked by one of Alcmene's servants and sent to another room. Juno then sent  serpents to kill him in his cradle, but Hercules strangled them both. In one version of the myth, Alcmene abandoned her baby in the woods in order to protect him from Juno's wrath, but he was found by the goddess Minerva who brought him to Juno, claiming he was an orphan child left in the woods who needed nourishment. Juno suckled Hercules at her own breast until the infant bit her nipple, at which point she pushed him away, spilling her milk across the night sky and so forming the Milky Way. She then gave the infant back to Minerva and told her to take care of the baby herself. In feeding the child from her own breast, the goddess inadvertently imbued him with further strength and power.

Death

Roman era

The Latin name Hercules was borrowed through Etruscan, where it is represented variously as Heracle, Hercle, and other forms. Hercules was a favorite subject for Etruscan art, and appears often on bronze mirrors. The Etruscan form Herceler derives from the Greek Heracles via syncope. A mild oath invoking Hercules (Hercule! or Mehercle!) was a common interjection in Classical Latin.

Hercules had a number of myths that were distinctly Roman. One of these is Hercules' defeat of Cacus, who was terrorizing the countryside of Rome. The hero was associated with the Aventine Hill through his son Aventinus. Mark Antony considered him a personal patron god, as did the emperor Commodus. Hercules received various forms of religious veneration, including as a deity concerned with children and childbirth, in part because of myths about his precocious infancy, and in part because he fathered countless children. Roman brides wore a special belt tied with the "knot of Hercules", which was supposed to be hard to untie. The comic playwright Plautus presents the myth of Hercules' conception as a sex comedy in his play Amphitryon; Seneca wrote the tragedy Hercules Furens about his bout with madness. During the Roman Imperial era, Hercules was worshipped locally from Hispania through Gaul.

Germanic association

Tacitus records a special affinity of the Germanic peoples for Hercules. In chapter 3 of his Germania, Tacitus states:

Some have taken this as Tacitus equating the Germanic Þunraz with Hercules by way of interpretatio romana.

In the Roman era Hercules' Club amulets appear from the 2nd to 3rd century, distributed over the empire (including Roman Britain, c.f. Cool 1986), mostly made of gold, shaped like wooden clubs. A specimen found in Köln-Nippes bears the inscription "DEO HER[culi]", confirming the association with Hercules.

In the 5th to 7th centuries, during the Migration Period, the amulet is theorized to have rapidly spread from the Elbe Germanic area across Europe. These Germanic "Donar's Clubs" were made from deer antler, bone or wood, more rarely also from bronze or precious metals. The amulet type is replaced by the Viking Age Thor's hammer pendants in the course of the Christianization of Scandinavia from the 8th to 9th century.

Medieval mythography

After the Roman Empire became Christianized, mythological narratives were often reinterpreted as allegory, influenced by the philosophy of late antiquity. In the 4th century, Servius had described Hercules' return from the underworld as representing his ability to overcome earthly desires and vices, or the earth itself as a consumer of bodies. In medieval mythography, Hercules was one of the heroes seen as a strong role model who demonstrated both valor and wisdom, while the monsters he battles were regarded as moral obstacles. One glossator noted that when Hercules became a constellation, he showed that strength was necessary to gain entrance to Heaven.

Medieval mythography was written almost entirely in Latin, and original Greek texts were little used as sources for Hercules' myths.

Renaissance mythography

The Renaissance and the invention of the printing press brought a renewed interest in and publication of Greek literature. Renaissance mythography drew more extensively on the Greek tradition of Heracles, typically under the Romanized name Hercules, or the alternate name Alcides. In a chapter of his book Mythologiae (1567), the influential mythographer Natale Conti collected and summarized an extensive range of myths concerning the birth, adventures, and death of the hero under his Roman name Hercules. Conti begins his lengthy chapter on Hercules with an overview description that continues the moralizing impulse of the Middle Ages:
Hercules, who subdued and destroyed monsters, bandits, and criminals, was justly famous and renowned for his great courage. His great and glorious reputation was worldwide, and so firmly entrenched that he'll always be remembered. In fact the ancients honored him with his own temples, altars, ceremonies, and priests. But it was his wisdom and great soul that earned those honors; noble blood, physical strength, and political power just aren't good enough.

In 1600, the citizens of Avignon bestowed on Henry of Navarre (the future King Henry IV of France) the title of the Hercule Gaulois ("Gallic Hercules"), justifying the extravagant flattery with a genealogy that traced the origin of the House of Navarre to a nephew of Hercules' son Hispalus.

Worship

Road of Hercules 

The Road of Hercules is a route across Southern Gaul that is associated with the path Hercules took during his 10th labor of retrieving the Cattle of Geryon from the Red Isles. Hannibal took the same path on his march towards Italy and encouraged the belief that he was the second Hercules. Primary sources often make comparisons between Hercules and Hannibal. Hannibal further tried to invoke parallels between himself and Hercules by starting his march on Italy by visiting the shrine of Hercules at Gades. While crossing the alps, he performed labors in a heroic manner.  A famous example was noted by Livy, when Hannibal fractured the side of a cliff that was blocking his march.

Worship from women 

In ancient Roman society women were usually limited to two types of cults: those that addressed feminine matters such as childbirth, and cults that required virginal chastity. However, there is evidence suggesting there were female worshippers of Apollo, Mars, Jupiter, and Hercules. Some scholars believe that women were completely prohibited from any of Hercules's cults. Others believe it was only the "Ara Maxima" at which they were not allowed to worship. Macrobius in his first book of Saturnalia paraphrases from Varro: "For when Hercules was bringing the cattle of Geryon through Italy, a woman replied to the thirsty hero that she could not give him water because it was the day of the Goddess Women and it was unlawful for a man to taste what had been prepared for her. Hercules, therefore, when he was about to offer a sacrifice forbid the presence of women and ordered Potitius and Pinarius who were in charge of his rites, not to allow any women from taking part". Macrobius states that women were restricted in their participation in Hercules cults, but to what extent remains ambiguous. He mentions that women were not allowed to participate in Sacrum which is general term used to describe anything that was believed to have belonged to the gods. This could include anything from a precious item to a temple. Due to the general nature of a Sacrum, we can not judge the extent of the prohibition from Macrobius alone. There are also ancient writings on this topic from Aulus Gellius when speaking on how Romans swore oaths. He mentioned that Roman women do not swear on Hercules, nor do Roman men swear on Castor. He went on to say that women refrain from sacrificing to Hercules. Propertius in his poem 4.9 also mentions similar information as Macrobius. This is evidence that he was also using Varro as a source.

Worship in myth 

There is evidence of Hercules worship in myth in the Latin epic poem, the Aeneid. In the 8th book of the poem Aeneas finally reaches the future site of Rome, where he meets Evander and the Arcadians making sacrifices to Hercules on the banks of the Tiber river. They share a feast, and Evander tells the story of how Hercules defeated the monster Cascus, and describes him as a triumphant hero. Translated from the Latin text of Vergil, Evander stated: "Time brought to us in our time of need the aid and arrival of a god. For there came that mightiest avenger, the victor Hercules, proud with the slaughter and the spoils of threefold Geryon, and he drove the mighty bulls here, and the cattle filled both valley and riverside.

Hercules was also mentioned in the Fables of Gaius Julius Hyginus. For example, in his fable about Philoctetes he tells the story of how Philoctetes built a funeral pyre for Hercules so his body could be consumed and raised to immortality.

Hercules and the Roman triumph

According to Livy (9.44.16) Romans were commemorating military victories by building statues to Hercules as early as 305 BCE. Also, philosopher Pliny the Elder dates Hercules worship back to the time of Evander, by accrediting him with erecting a statue in the Forum Boarium of Hercules. Scholars agree that there would have been 5–7 temples in Augustan Rome. There are believed to be related Republican triumphatores, however, not necessarily triumphal dedications. There is two temples located in the Campus Martius. One, being the Temple of Hercules Musarum, dedicated between 187 and 179 BCE by M. Fulvius Nobilior. And the other being the Temple of Hercules Custos, likely renovated by Sulla in the 80s BCE.

In art
In Roman works of art and in Renaissance and post-Renaissance art, Hercules can be identified by his attributes, the lion skin and the gnarled club (his favorite weapon); in mosaic he is shown tanned bronze, a virile aspect.

In the twentieth century, the Farnese Hercules has inspired artists such as Jeff Koons, Matthew Darbyshire and Robert Mapplethorpe to reinterpret Hercules for new audiences. The choice of deliberately white materials by Koons and Darbyshire has been interpreted as perpetuation of colourism in how the classical world is viewed. Mapplethorpe's work with black model Derrick Cross can be seen as a reaction to Neo-classical colourism, resisting the portrayal of Hercules as white.

Roman era

Modern era

In numismatics
Hercules was among the earliest figures on ancient Roman coinage, and has been the main motif of many collector coins and medals since. One example is the Austrian 20 euro Baroque Silver coin issued on September 11, 2002. The obverse side of the coin shows the Grand Staircase in the town palace of Prince Eugene of Savoy in Vienna, currently the Austrian Ministry of Finance. Gods and demi-gods hold its flights, while Hercules stands at the turn of the stairs.

Military

Six successive ships of the British Royal Navy, from the 18th to the 20th century, bore the name HMS Hercules.

In the French Navy, there were no less than nineteen ships called Hercule, plus three more named Alcide which is another name of the same hero.

Hercules' name was also used for five ships of the US Navy, four ships of the Spanish Navy, four of the Argentine Navy and two of the Swedish Navy, as well as for numerous civilian sailing and steam ships.

In modern aviation a military transport aircraft produced by Lockheed Martin carries the title Lockheed C-130 Hercules.

Operation Herkules was the German code-name given to an abortive plan for the invasion of Malta during the  Second World War.

Other cultural references

In films

A series of nineteen Italian Hercules movies were made in the late 1950s and early 1960s. The actors who played Hercules in these films were Steve Reeves, Gordon Scott, Kirk Morris, Mickey Hargitay, Mark Forest, Alan Steel, Dan Vadis, Brad Harris, Reg Park, Peter Lupus (billed as Rock Stevens) and Michael Lane. A number of English-dubbed Italian films that featured the name of Hercules in their title were not intended to be movies about Hercules.

See also
 Hercules (comics)
 Hercules (constellation)
 Hercules in popular culture of the 20th and 21st centuries
 Sword-and-sandal
 Hercules: The Legendary Journeys
 Strength (Tarot card)
 Samson
 Gilgamesh
 Melqart
 Demigod

References
Notes

Sources
 Charlotte Coffin. "Hercules" in Peyré, Yves (ed.) A Dictionary of Shakespeare's Classical Mythology (2009)
 Bertematti, Richard (2014). "The Heracliad: The Epic Saga of Hercules" (Tridium Press).

External links
 
 

 
Heracles
Heroes in mythology and legend
Children of Zeus
Metamorphoses characters
Roman gods
Lion deities